Diazodinitrophenol (DDNP) was the first diazo compound produced; it was subsequently used to make dyes and explosives.  It forms yellow crystals in pure form; however, the color of impure forms may vary from dark yellow to green to dark brown. It is soluble in acetic acid, acetone, concentrated hydrochloric acid, most non-polar solvents and is slightly soluble in water.
 
A solution of cold sodium hydroxide may be used to destroy it. DDNP may be desensitized by immersing it in water, as it does not react in water at normal temperature.  It is less sensitive to impact but more powerful than mercury fulminate and almost as powerful as lead azide. The sensitivity of DDNP to friction is much less than that of mercury fulminate and lead azide.

DDNP is used with other materials to form priming mixtures, particularly where a high sensitivity to flame or heat is desired. DDNP is often used as an initiating explosive in propellant primer devices and is a substitute for lead styphnate in what are termed "green" or "non-toxic" (lead free) priming explosive compositions. Lead free primers have been judged as inadequate for service use in firearms due to weak and uneven initiation compared to lead based primers.

History

Diazodinitrophenol was first prepared in 1858 by the German chemist Peter Griess.  It was among the first diazo compounds and for a long time thereafter it was 
used as a starting material for dyes.  Although Griess had mentioned in 1859 that diazodinitrophenol exploded upon heating, it was not until 1892 that diazodinitrophenol was first used as an explosive – when Wilhelm Will and Friedrich Lenze, German chemists at the Militär-Versuchsamt (military research office) in Spandau, Germany, began to investigate azides as potential initiators of explosives.  The research was conducted secretly. After a fatal accident, the work was discontinued.

References

Explosive chemicals
Nitrobenzenes
Diazo compounds
Ketones